Bill Doss (September 12, 1968 – July 30, 2012) was an American rock musician. He co-founded The Elephant 6 Recording Company in Athens, Georgia and was a key member of The Olivia Tremor Control. Following the band's breakup, he led The Sunshine Fix and later became a member of The Apples in Stereo. Doss was married to freelance photographer Amy Hairston Doss, whom he met while both were attending Louisiana Tech University.

Early career 
Doss was a native of Dubach, Louisiana, where he met Will Cullen Hart, Robert Schneider and Jeff Mangum, his friends at nearby Ruston High School. Before the Olivia Tremor Control Doss had recorded under the name The Sunshine Fix, and self-released A Spiraling World of Pop, which later helped comprise The Olivia Tremor Control songs. Before the Olivia Tremor Control, Doss had spent some time in the army, after which he joined New York-based band Chocolate USA before returning to Athens, Georgia, where he was a resident at the time of his death.

Olivia Tremor Control 
Doss, Hart and Mangum soon formed what was later to become the Olivia Tremor Control.   After Mangum left the band to pursue his own Neutral Milk Hotel, Hart and Doss began to pool their musical influences, Hart being a proponent of experimentalism, Doss of 60's pop such as The Beatles, the Beach Boys and The Zombies. After the release of the second The Olivia Tremor Control album, Black Foliage, the band broke up in 2000.

Post-Olivia Tremor Control 

Doss went on to restart The Sunshine Fix. That band's first full-length album, Age of the Sun, was released in 2002. In 2004, TSF released the less well received Green Imagination (which featured artwork and videos by Kevin Evans). Doss began touring with The Apples in Stereo in early 2006, playing keyboards. He appeared on the Apples' 2007 album New Magnetic Wonder, was listed as a full-fledged band member on the band's 2010 album Travellers in Space and Time, and contributed to the songwriting on both albums. At the time of his death, Doss was producing albums in his own studio in Athens.

Death 
Doss's death, as a result of an aneurysm, was announced on July 31, 2012.

Performing discography

The Olivia Tremor Control 
Albums
Music From The Unrealized Film Script "Dusk At Cubist Castle" (1996)
Explanation II: Instrumental Themes and Dream Sequences (1998)
Black Foliage: Animation Music Volume 1 (1999)
Those Sessions (1999)
Singles and Beyond (2000)
The Same Place (Unreleased)

EPs / Singles
California Demise (1994)
Split with Apples in Stereo (1994)
The Giant Day (1996)
The Opera House (1997)
The Olivia Tremor Control Vs. Black Swan Network (1997)
Jumping Fences (1998)
Hideway (1998)

The Sunshine Fix 
Albums
 A Spiraling World of Pop (Cassette Only) (1993)
 Age of the Sun (2002)
 Green Imagination (2004)

EPs / Singles
 Sunshine Fix (7") (1999)
 The Future History of a Sunshine Fix (7") (2000)
 That Ole' Sun (7") (2001)

Chocolate USA 
Albums
Smoke Machine (1994)

The Apples in Stereo 
Albums
New Magnetic Wonder (2007)
Travellers in Space and Time (2010)

References

External links 

The Sunshine Fix at Elephant6.com

1968 births
2012 deaths
American rock guitarists
American male guitarists
Louisiana Tech University alumni
People from Ruston, Louisiana
Musicians from Athens, Georgia
Ruston High School alumni
The Apples in Stereo members
The Elephant 6 Recording Company artists
People from Dubach, Louisiana
Guitarists from Georgia (U.S. state)
20th-century American guitarists
20th-century American male musicians
The Olivia Tremor Control members